Progreso is a village in the Corozal District of the nation of Belize, with a population of 1,357 according to the 2010 Population and Housing Census.

References

Populated places in Corozal District